John Howard Getty "J. J." Johnson (October 18, 1947 – January 7, 2016) was an American professional basketball player.

High school and college career 
Johnson played high school basketball at Messmer High School in Milwaukee, Wisconsin.  As a senior, he helped lead Messmer to the Wisconsin state title in 1966.

Johnson, a 6’7" small forward, then played for Northwest College in Powell, Wyoming and for the University of Iowa.  He set an Iowa record for points in a season during his senior year, when he averaged 27.9 points per game.  Johnson also holds Iowa's top two scoring performances with 49 and 46 points.  Johnson played two seasons for Iowa, leading the team in scoring and rebounding both seasons.  Johnson, accompanied by later Seattle SuperSonics teammate Fred Brown, guided Iowa to a 14-0 Big Ten record and NCAA tournament berth in 1970.

Professional career 
Johnson was selected by the Cleveland Cavaliers with the 7th pick of the 1970 NBA Draft.  Johnson was also selected in the 1970 ABA Draft by the Texas Chaparrals. He was the first Cavaliers player to play in an NBA All Star Game.

In 1977, Johnson was traded to the Seattle SuperSonics and was reunited with former Iowa Hawkeye teammate Fred Brown.  Johnson was a key contributor for Seattle, who went to the NBA Finals in 1977–78 and won an NBA championship in 1978–79 while possibly becoming the first point forward in league history as he was the player who more often set the plays for the Sonics rather than their star guards Dennis Johnson and Gus Williams.

Overall, Johnson had a productive 12-year NBA career with four teams, making two NBA All-Star Game appearances and scoring 11,200 career points.  He ended his NBA career in Seattle in the early 1980s.

Later years 
Johnson moved from Seattle to San Jose when his son Mitch was recruited to play for Stanford. His son played on the Stanford University basketball team from 2005 to 2008.  On January 7, 2016, at age 68, John Johnson died in his San Jose residence of undetermined cause.

References

External links 

1947 births
2016 deaths
African-American basketball players
All-American college men's basketball players
American men's basketball players
Basketball players from Mississippi
Basketball players from Milwaukee
Cleveland Cavaliers draft picks
Cleveland Cavaliers players
Houston Rockets players
Iowa Hawkeyes men's basketball players
Junior college men's basketball players in the United States
National Basketball Association All-Stars
People from Carthage, Mississippi
Portland Trail Blazers players
Seattle SuperSonics players
Small forwards
Texas Chaparrals draft picks
20th-century African-American sportspeople
21st-century African-American people